The German Imperial Navy built a series of protected cruisers in the 1880s and 1890s, starting with the two ships of the . The Navy only completed two additional classes of protected cruisers, comprising six more ships: the unique , and the five  ships. Because of limited budgets in the pre-Tirpitz era, the German Navy attempted to build vessels that could serve as overseas cruisers and scouts for the fleet, though the ships were not satisfactory. The protected cruiser designs generally copied developments in foreign navies. The Victoria Louise design resembled contemporary German battleships, which favored smaller-caliber main guns and more secondary guns than on their foreign counterparts.

Most of the German protected cruisers served on overseas stations throughout their careers, primarily in the East Asia Squadron in the 1890s and 1900s.  participated in the seizure of the Kiautschou Bay concession in November 1897, which was used as the primary base for the East Asia Squadron. Kaiserin Augusta, and  assisted in the suppression of the Boxer Uprising in China in 1900, and  saw action during the Venezuela Crisis of 1902–1903, where she bombarded several Venezuelan fortresses. , Prinzess Wilhelm, and Kaiserin Augusta were relegated to secondary duties in the 1910s, while the Victoria Louise class was used to train naval cadets in the 1900s. All eight ships were broken up for scrap in the early 1920s.



Irene class 

The Irene class was the first protected cruiser design built by the German Imperial Navy. As built, the ships were armed with a main battery of fourteen  breech-loading guns, of which four were L/30 models and ten shorter L/22 guns. They were modernized in 1899–1905, and their armament was upgraded with new,  SK L/35 quick-firing guns.

Both ships served in the East Asia station with the East Asia Squadron; Prinzess Wilhelm played a major role in the seizure of the Kiautschou Bay concession in November 1897, under command of Admiral Otto von Diederichs. The two ships were sent to safeguard German interests in the Philippines after the Battle of Manila Bay during the Spanish–American War. There, Irenes presence caused tensions with the American squadron occupying the islands. Both ships returned to Germany at the turn of the century, and remained in European waters until 1914, when they were removed from active service. They were reduced to secondary roles—Irene was used as a submarine tender and Prinzess Wilhelm was hulked—and continued to serve until the early 1920s, when they were sold for scrap.

Kaiserin Augusta 

Kaiserin Augusta was a unique protected cruiser built for the German Navy in the early 1890s. She was laid down at the Germaniawerft shipyard in 1890, launched in January 1892, and completed in November of that year. Kaiserin Augusta was designed to serve both as a fleet scout and a colonial cruiser due to budgetary limitations. As built, the ship was armed with a main battery of four 15 cm K L/30 and eight  SK L/35 guns, though by 1896 they were replaced with twelve newer 15 cm SK L/35 guns. She was the first ship in the German Navy to feature a three-shaft propeller arrangement. The ship had significant stability problems, shipped excessive quantities of water in a head sea, and maneuvered poorly.

Kaiserin Augusta served on foreign stations between 1897 and 1902, primarily in the East Asia Squadron. While in Chinese waters in 1900, the ship's crew assisted in the suppression of the Boxer Uprising. She returned to Germany in 1902 for an extensive overhaul that lasted until 1907, after which she went into reserve. Following the outbreak of World War I in 1914, Kaiserin Augusta was mobilized to serve as a gunnery training ship. She served in this role throughout the war; the ship was ultimately sold for scrapping in October 1919 and broken up the following year.

Victoria Louise class 

The Victoria Louise class was the last class of protected cruisers built for the German Navy. The class design introduced the combined clipper and ram bow and the blocky sides that typified later German armored cruisers. The ships were laid down in 1895 and 1896, launched in 1897 and 1898, and commissioned into the fleet over the following year. Problems with the Niclausse boilers installed on Vineta prompted the Navy to standardize boiler types in future warships; from then on, only Schulz-Thornycroft or Marine type boilers would be used. All five ships were armed with a main battery of two 21 cm SK L/40 guns and eight 15 cm SK L/40 guns.

The ships of the class served in various units in the German fleet, including on the America Station, in the East Asia Squadron, and with the home fleet. Hertha and Hansa participated in the suppression of the Boxer Uprising in China in 1900, and Vineta was involved in the Venezuela Crisis of 1902–1903. All five ships were modernized between 1905 and 1911, after which they served as training ships for naval cadets. They were mobilized into the 5th Scouting Group at the outbreak of World War I, but were quickly withdrawn from front-line service. They served in various secondary roles for the rest of the war. Afterward, Victoria Louise was converted into a merchant ship, but was broken up in 1923. The other four ships were scrapped in 1920 and 1921.

Notes

Footnotes

Citations

References

Further reading 
 
 
 

Protected cruisers
German protected cruisers